The 2012–13 Turlock Express season was the second season of the Turlock Express professional indoor soccer club. The Express, a Pacific Division team in the Professional Arena Soccer League, played their home games in the Turlock Soccer Complex in Turlock, California. The team was led by head coach Art Pulido.

Season summary
The Express were successful in the regular season, compiling a 9–7 record and placing second in the Pacific Division. The team won and lost in streaks, dropping their first two games, winning their next six, losing the following five, and ending the regular season with three straight wins. The Express qualified for the postseason and earned the right to play for the Ron Newman Cup in the PASL National Championship. The team lost two straight games to the San Diego Sockers in the Pacific Divisional Finals, ending their playoff run.

The Express participated in the 2012–13 United States Open Cup for Arena Soccer. They defeated the Sacramento Surge in the Wild Card round and the Las Vegas Knights of the Premier Arena Soccer League in the Round of 16 before losing to the San Diego Sockers in the Quarter-Finals, ending their tournament run.

Off-field moves
Turlock was originally scheduled to host the Tacoma Stars on both January 25 and February 15, 2013. To reduce travel costs, the latter game was moved up to January 25 to form a doubleheader.

Roster moves
On December 4, 2012, the PASL named rookie Ivan Campos as its Player of the Week. The league cited his four goals (including the game-winning goal in overtime) against the Anaheim Bolts as well as his having scored in each of the first five Express games.

One of the team's leading scorers, Bronil Koochoie, is a graduate of Turlock High School but has international professional experience with teams in Sweden, Thailand, and Iran as well as several domestic leagues, both indoor and outdoor.

Awards and honors
In postseason honors, forward Ivan Campos was named to the 2012-13 PASL All-League Second Team.

Schedule

Regular season

† Game also counts for US Open Cup, as listed in chart below.

Postseason

2012–13 US Open Cup for Arena Soccer

References

External links
Turlock Express official website

Turlock Express seasons
Turlock Express
Turlock Express 2012
Turlock Express 2012